Joseph Pathalil (26 January 1937 – 14 April 2022) was an Indian Roman Catholic prelate. 

Pathalil was born in India and was ordained to the priesthood in 1963. He served as bishop of the Roman Catholic Diocese of Udaipur, India, from 1984 until his retirement in 2012.

References

1937 births
2022 deaths
Indian Roman Catholic bishops
20th-century Roman Catholic bishops in India
21st-century Roman Catholic bishops in India
Bishops appointed by Pope John Paul II
People from Udaipur